The 1985 FIVB Men's World Cup was held from 22 November to 1 December 1985 in Japan. The World Cup brought together eight teams. The matches were played in Round Robin. Each team played each other (a total of 7 matches per team).

Qualification

* Cuba replaced by Argentina.

Results

|}

Location: Osaka

|}

Location: Nagoya

|}

Location: Hiroshima

|}

Location: Nagoya

|}

Location: Tokyo

|}

Final standing

Awards

 Most Valuable Player
  Karch Kiraly
 Best Spiker
  Renan Dal Zotto
 Best Blocker
  Stefan Christianski

 Best Setter
  Dusty Dvorak
 Best Defender
  Aldis Berzins
 Best on the pitch
  Yaroslav Antonov

References

External links
 Results

FIVB Volleyball Men's World Cup
Men's World Cup